The Hanwha Eagles are a South Korean professional baseball team based in Daejeon. They are a member of the KBO League. The Eagles' home ballpark is Daejeon Hanbat Baseball Stadium. The Eagles have won the Korean Series once, in 1999, and the league pennant twice. As of 2022, the Eagles have played in the postseason 13 times, being the runner-up in the Korean Series five times.

History 
Founded in 1985 as the Binggrae Eagles (Binggrae was the then-trademark of Hanwha's confectionery branch), they debuted in 1986 as the seventh franchise of the league. Japanese-born pitcher Jang Myeong-bu went 1–18 with a 4.98 ERA in the 1986 season. The team went 31–76 overall in 1986, and Jang retired after the season.

The Eagles made it to the Korean Series four times in their first seven years of existence (in 1988, 1989, 1991, and 1992), losing each time. In 1993, the club changed its name to Hanwha Eagles after Binggrae's separation from Hanwha conglomerate.

Pitchers Song Jin-woo and Jung Min-cheul were the team's one-two punch through the 1990s and much of the 2000s. He currently holds several KBO pitching records, including his 210 wins, 2,048 strikeouts, and 3,003 innings pitched. He is the only pitcher in KBO League history to win 200 games, and the only one to strike out 2,000 or more batters. Jung, for his part, played 16 seasons for the Eagles (1992–1999 and 2002–2009). He won at least ten games for the team for eight straight seasons, from 1992 through 1999.

The club was renowned for its slugging percentage from the late 1990s to the early 2000s, nicknamed the "Dynamite Bats" in reference to explosive products under one of Hanwha's main business lines. The 1999 championship team was led by American imports Dan Rohrmeier and Jay Davis, as well as Koreans Song Ji-man and Chang Jong-hoon, and had a slugging percentage of .487, the highest team total in KBO League history.

The Eagles made it back to the Korean Series in 2006, again falling short. The Eagles did not make the KBO playoffs for eleven years, from 2008 through 2017, despite going through five managers during that time, including the KBO's two winningest managers, Kim Eung-ryong (2013–2014) and Kim Sung-keun (2015–2017).

Han Yong-duk was hired as Eagles' manager in 2018 (he had been a caretaker manager for the team in 2012), and in his first full season he succeeded in bringing the team to the postseason for the first time since 2007. On 7 June 2020, however, Han resigned as manager after a 14th straight loss, and was replaced by the team's minor league manager (and former television announcer), Choi Won-ho. The team also revamped its roster, sending ten players to the minor-league KBO Futures League team — including veterans An Young-myung, Jang Si-hwan, Lee Tae-yang, Song Kwang-min, and Lee Sung-yul — and bringing up nine players to the KBO League team. After tying the record for the KBO's longest losing streak at 18, on 14 June 2020, the Eagles escaped a 19th-straight defeat after a long struggle: Hanwha won a suspended game against Doosan Bears thanks to Roh Tae-hyung's walk-off hit in the bottom of the ninth inning.

On 27 November 2020, Carlos Subero was announced as the Eagles' new manager.

Season-by-season records

Personnel

Current lineup

Managers
Bae Seong-seo (1986–1987)
Kim Yeong-duk (1988–1992)
Kang Byeong-cheol (1993–1998)
Lee Hui-su (1998–2000)
Lee Kwang-hwan (2001–2002)
Yu Seung-an (2003–2004)
Kim In-sik (2005–2009)
Han Dae-hwa (2010–2012)
Han Yong-duk (2012) (caretaker)
Kim Eung-ryong (2013–2014)
Kim Sung-keun (2015–2017)
Lee Sang-gun (2017) (caretaker)
Han Yong-duk (2018–2020)
Choi Won-ho (2020) (caretaker)
Carlos Subero (2020–present)

Retired numbers 
The Eagles have three retired numbers on their roster. Those are for the slugger Chang Jong-hoon (35), and the pitchers Jung Min-cheul (23) and Song Jin-woo (21).

References
General

Specific

External links 

 Official website 

 
KBO League teams
Baseball teams established in 1985
1985 establishments in South Korea
Sport in Daejeon
Hanwha